Jeanne Behrend (11 May 1911 – 20 March 1988) was an American pianist, music educator, musicologist and composer.

Life
Jeanne Behrend was born in Philadelphia and graduated from the Curtis Institute in 1934, where she studied piano with Josef Hofmann and composition with Rosario Scalero. She made her debut with the Philadelphia Orchestra in 1922 and at Carnegie Hall in 1937, playing one of her own compositions.

After completing her education, Behrend worked as a pianist and composer and taught music at Juilliard, the Philadelphia Conservatory of Music, and Temple University.  Becoming aware of the lack of opportunity for American composers, she became a champion of American music and concentrated on her career as a performer.

Behrend edited a selection of Louis Moreau Gottschalk piano scores and his autobiography, Notes of a Pianist. She also edited a collection of Stephen Foster songs and one of American fuguing tunes. She married twice. Her first husband, pianist Alexander Kelberine died in 1940, and her second husband, Americana book dealer George S. McManus died in 1967.

Behrend received the Joseph Bearns prize from Columbia University in 1936 for composition. She was recommended for sponsorship by Heitor Villa-Lobos and toured in South America from 1945-46. She founded and directed the Philadelphia Festival of Western Hemisphere Music in 1959 and 1960 and was awarded the Order of the Southern Cross from Brazil. Behrend died in Philadelphia and her papers are housed in the Free Library in the city.

Works
Selected works include:
A Child's Day, piano suite
From Dawn to Dusk for orchestra, 1939
Lamentation for viola and pianoforte, 1944
Quiet Piece for piano, 1932
Festival Fanfare: Prelude to the National Anthem, 1959

Behrend edited Louis Moreau Gottschalk's Notes of a Pianist (New York, 1964) and also selections of his music.

References

External links
Stinson, Jennifer. "Jeanne Behrend", Jewish Women: A Comprehensive Historical Encyclopedia
Jeanne Behrend - David Guion: Country Jig in D major from YouTube

1911 births
1988 deaths
20th-century classical composers
American women classical composers
American classical composers
Musicians from Philadelphia
Curtis Institute of Music alumni
Juilliard School faculty
Temple University faculty
Jewish American classical composers
20th-century American women musicians
20th-century American musicians
20th-century American composers
Classical musicians from Pennsylvania
Women music educators
20th-century women composers
American women academics
20th-century American Jews